Steven Peter Devereux Smith (born 2 June 1989) is an Australian international cricketer and former captain of the Australian national team. Smith is best known for his high consistency to score runs in Test cricket. Smith has drawn comparisons to batter Don Bradman, for his distinctively high Test batting average.

Although he was initially selected for Australia as a right-arm leg spinner, Smith later played primarily as a batsman. After playing five matches from 2010 to 2011, he was recalled to the Australian team in 2013, and took over the captaincy from Michael Clarke in late 2015, after which he predominantly batted at number 3 or 4.

Awards he has won include the Sir Garfield Sobers Trophy (ICC Cricketer of the Year) in 2015; ICC Test Player of the Year in 2015 and 2017; ICC Men's Test Player of the Decade for 2011–2020; the Allan Border Medal for the best player in Australian Cricket in 2015, 2018, 2021 and 2023; Australian Test Player of the Year in 2015 and 2018, and Australian One Day International Player of the Year in 2015 and 2021. He was named by Wisden as one of their Cricketers of the Year in the 2016 Wisden Almanack.

In 2014, New Zealand batsman Martin Crowe described Smith as one of the young Fab Four of Test cricket along with Joe Root, Kane Williamson and Virat Kohli. On 30 December 2017, he reached a Test batting rating of 947, the second-highest of all time, only behind Don Bradman's 961.

In March 2018, Smith was widely criticised for overseeing ball tampering in the third Test against South Africa, during which he stood down from the team captaincy and was replaced by Tim Paine. Following an investigation by Cricket Australia, Smith was banned from all international and domestic cricket in Australia for one year starting from 29 March 2018, and from consideration for any leadership role for an additional year.

Early and personal life
Steve Smith was born on 2 June 1989 in Kogarah, Sydney to an Australian father, Peter, who has a degree in chemistry, and an English mother, Gillian. Smith attended Menai High School, and left at age 17 to play cricket in England where he played club cricket for Sevenoaks Vine in the Kent Cricket League. He did so well for Sevenoaks that he was picked to play for Surrey's second XI.

Because his mother was born in London, Smith has dual British and Australian citizenship. In 2011, Smith started dating Dani Willis, a commerce and law student at Macquarie University. In June 2017, the couple announced their engagement while on holiday in New York. The couple married at Berrima, New South Wales on 15 September 2018.

Youth and domestic career

Smith was a member of the Australian team at the 2008 Under-19 Cricket World Cup in Malaysia. In the tournament he scored 114 runs and took seven wickets in four matches.

Smith made his first-class debut for New South Wales against Western Australia at the SCG on 25 January 2008. He scored 33 in his only innings as New South Wales defeated Western Australia outright. He was part of the New South Wales team that won the 2009 Twenty20 Champions League. In the final against Trinidad and Tobago at Hyderabad, Smith made 33 with the bat and took two wickets.

By the end of the 2009–10 domestic season, Smith had a first-class batting average of over 50 after 13 first-class matches. While his first-class bowling average in the high forties was not as impressive, his bowling appeared to be steadily improving following some well-publicised mentoring and praise from Shane Warne. In the final match of the season he took 7 for 64 in the second innings against South Australia.

Big Bash League

Smith made his Twenty20 cricket debut for New South Wales in a match against South Australia at Adelaide on 1 January 2008 during the six team KFC Big Bash competition. Smith was the leading wicket taker at the 2008 Big Bash tournament. He took 4/15 against Queensland and finished with 9 wickets overall. He was also named the second-best player of the tournament. In 2011–12, the Australian T20 competition became the city-based Big Bash League featuring eight teams. Smith joined the Sydney Sixers and filled in as captain when Brad Haddin could not play due to Test duties, subsequently leading the team to victory in the inaugural season. As an all-rounder, he scored 166 runs with the bat from nine matches with a strike rate of 130.71, including one half century. With the ball, he took 6 wickets at an economy rate of 8.06 per over. He also took nine catches throughout the tournament. In the final match, the Sixers beat Perth Scorchers by 7 wickets while chasing down the target of 157 within 18.5 overs after the Scorchers made 5/156 in 20 overs. Smith's good form during the Big Bash League, attracted the attention of former India Captain Sourav Ganguly, and was recruited to play for the Pune Warriors India team captained by Sourav Ganguly in the 2012 Indian Premier League. Smith was also been made captain of the team for one match, when Ganguly was rested, despite Australian captain Michael Clarke being the vice-captain. He continued to play for the same franchise in 2013, under the captaincy of Angelo Mathews. Smith reunited with the Sydney Sixers in 2023 after missing two years of the Big Bash, rejoining in BBL{{|}}12. In his second match, against Adelaide Strikers, he scored 101 runs off 56 deliveries as the Sixers won by 59 runs.
In the next match, Smith score 125* runs off 66 deliveries against Sydney Thunder.

Indian Premier League
Smith was first bought by Royal Challengers Bangalore for the 2010 Indian Premier League as a replacement for Jesse Ryder. During the 2011 IPL player auction, he was bought by Kochi Tuskers Kerala for $200,000, but he had to have an ankle operation and was not available to play for them that season.

The next season, Kochi Tuskers were dropped from the IPL and Smith was put up for auction. He went unsold at the 2012 IPL Players Auction, but was later bought as a replacement for Mitchell Marsh by the Pune Warriors India. In his first match for his new team, he scored 39 runs off 32 balls to lead his team to victory against the Mumbai Indians. He received the Man of the Match award for this effort.

In the auction for IPL 2014, Smith was bought by Rajasthan Royals for $600,000. Smith was given the captaincy of the Royals in the latter half of the 2015 season and led the team to significant victories, thus ensuring a berth for his team in the play-off part of the tournament.

During the 2016 IPL Auction, Smith was bought by new franchise, the Rising Pune Supergiants for the same price as in the previous auction ($600,000), and struggled early for form. Smith finally broke a run of low scores against Sunrisers Hyderabad, scoring 46*. His form continued as he registered his maiden T20 century against the Gujarat Lions, scoring 101 off 54 balls. He then went on to score a further 45 against the Mumbai Indians, before being ruled out of the remainder of the tournament with a wrist injury.

The Supergiant management axed MS Dhoni as captain and named Smith as captain for the 2017 season. In RPS's first game against Mumbai Indians, Smith led his team to victory in style, scoring 84* and was rewarded with the Man of The Match award. Three consecutive losses, however, left his team in last position on the points table. A run of 8 wins in 10 matches helped Supergiant finish in the second position, and thus qualify for the playoffs, with Smith receiving praise for his captaincy from renowned cricketers and experts like Sunil Gavaskar and Kevin Pietersen. He led his team to the final with a 20-run victory over Mumbai Indians in Qualifier 1. In the final Smith's men faced Mumbai yet again. He scored 51 off 50 balls but could not lead RPS to victory. Pune lost the match by one run. Smith was RPS's highest run scorer in the tournament, scoring 472 runs at an average of 39.33, including three fifties.

In February 2018, he was named as captain of Rajasthan Royals for the IPL 2018. However, following his admission of involvement in the Australian test side's ball tampering controversy in the Third Test in South Africa in March 2018, it was announced by the team that Smith has stood down from that role and Ajinkya Rahane took charge as the new captain for Rajasthan Royals team.

On 28 March 2018, after being banned by Cricket Australia for his involvement in a ball tampering incident, Smith's player contract with the Royals was terminated by the Board of Control for Cricket in India as Steve Smith and fellow Australian batsman David Warner were banned from playing for their respective teams for the upcoming 2018 IPL edition.

In November 2018, Smith was retained by Rajasthan Royals for the 2019 Indian Premier League. After losing six out of first eight matches of the season, Smith was appointed as the captain of the Rajasthan Royals by replacing Ajinkya Rahane. In the tournament, he scored 319 runs at an average of 39.87, including three fifties.

He went unsold in the 2022 IPL auctions.

Other T20 franchise cricket

In May 2018, Smith was named as one of the ten marquee players for the first edition of the Global T20 Canada cricket tournament. On 3 June 2018, he was selected to play for the Toronto Nationals in the players' draft for the inaugural edition of the tournament. In his first representative match since his conviction for ball-tampering,  Smith scored 61 runs from 41 balls alongside Anton Devcich as the Toronto Nationals won by six wickets against the Vancouver Knights. In the tournament he scored 167 runs in six matches at an average of 33.40, including two fifties.

In July 2018, Smith was named in Barbados Tridents's squad in the sixth edition of Caribbean Premier League.

In September 2018, Smith returned to Australian club cricket by scoring 85 off 91 balls for Sutherland in a one-day match against Mosman. In October 2018, he was named as one of the fourteen Platinum category players for the fourth edition of the Pakistan Super League.

In December 2018, Smith was named in Comilla Victorians's squad in the sixth edition of Bangladesh Premier League. He played only two matches of the tournament before returning to Australia for elbow surgery.

2010–2011: Debut and early international career
Steve Smith made his international cricket debut in a Twenty20 International match playing as a leg spinner against Pakistan at Melbourne in February 2010. The same month, he made his One Day International debut against the West Indies also at Melbourne, playing in the fifth match of the series.

In the 2010 ICC World Twenty20 competition held in the West Indies, Australia finished runners up to England. Smith took 11 wickets in seven matches at an average of 14.81 to finish as the equal-second-highest wicket-taker of the tournament.

Smith made his Test debut at Lord's in July 2010, playing both Tests against Pakistan in the 2010 Test series played in England. He was selected mainly for his bowling, and batted down the order, although his bowling was not required in the first innings. In the second innings, he took 3 wickets for 51 as Australia won by 150 runs. In the second Test he was called to bowl only ten overs and took no wickets, although he played an impressive role with the bat in the second innings. Batting with the tail, he scored 77 including nine fours and two sixes off successive balls, helping Australia to set a competitive target after having been bowled out for 88 in the first innings.

Smith's fielding attracted attention during the 2009–10 season with some spectacular catches in the outfield.

In the 2010–11 Australian summer, Smith played three Tests in the 2010–11 Ashes series, this time playing more as a batsman, taking the number six spot in the order. His performances were solid during the series, getting a number of starts and scoring two half centuries. Following the 2010–11 Ashes, Smith did not play another Test for two years, his next Test series coming against India in March 2013.

2013–15: Return and breakthrough

Tour to India and back-to-back Ashes 2013–14
Smith's return to the test team came during the 2013 tour of India. In the previous two Sheffield seasons his form had been middling, averaging 37, but he was chosen for the 17-man squad, primarily as a backup batsman, rather than an allrounder as he had been in the Test team previously. Smith was selected for the third test in Mohali, his first in over two years, when four players were dropped for "not doing their homework", in a scandal known as Homeworkgate.

In his first match innings in India he scored 92 before being stumped by Dhoni from a delivery by Pragyan Ojha, and in the second innings he managed 5 runs. In the final Test match at Delhi, Smith made 46 and 18 runs, respectively, but Australia was unable to win the Test match as India secured a 4–0 series win.

Following the defeat to India, Australia's next series was against England in the British Isles in July. Although the squad for the 2013 Ashes was finalised in April, Smith was the vice-captain of Australia's A team and was later called into the main squad after showing some promise in the Australia's A tour to the United Kingdom in June where he made 133 runs against Ireland in Belfast but also as a backup batsman due to Michael Clarke's fitness concerns. He played his first-class tour match with the main squad on 2 July 2013 in Worcester making 111 runs in both innings combined. In the first Test match at Trent Bridge he made a half century in his first innings but fell cheaply in the second innings getting out lbw to Graeme Swann. While making little impact at Lord's, Smith produced a century at Hove against Sussex on 27 July.

In the third Test being 2–0 down to England, Australia moved up north to Old Trafford Cricket Ground in Manchester needing to win or draw to save the series. Smith made 89 and 19 runs, respectively, but the third Test match stirred controversy about the on-field umpire's decisions and DRS (Decision Review System) causing Smith to survive on two occasions and his teammate Usman Khawaja to be dismissed. In the final Test, Smith scored his maiden Test century, which came in the first innings of the last Test of the series at The Oval, reaching the total in style by hitting a six off the bowling of Jonathan Trott. He remained unbeaten on 138. Smith became only the sixth Australian to reach his maiden Test 100 with a six. At the end of the series, the urn was retained by England after winning the series 3–0. Smith played in all five Tests, scoring 345 runs at an average of 38.33.

Smith remained in the team for the first Test of 2013–14 Ashes series in Brisbane. Despite starting slowly in the first two Tests, Smith produced his first Test century on home soil in the third Test at Perth, scoring 111 from 208 balls, helping Australia display a total of 6–326 at stumps on the second day to later win the Test match and be awarded man of the match. It was during this innings at the WACA which he decided to take a "prelim movement back and across" to counter short-pitched bowling and has even exaggerated it, according to Smith, "I was probably batting on middle and leg and going to middle at that point ... I've sort of moved things a little bit across to leg stump and now I'm going just outside off stump". Smith remarked "Everything sort of just clicked into place and it felt really good so I've continued doing it". Despite his success in the first innings, he mistimed a pull shot in the second innings, the ball caught in the deep by substitute fielder Bairstow off Ben Stokes' bowling, being dismissed for 15 from 50 deliveries.

In the fourth Test at the MCG he was dismissed on 19 by Stuart Broad, but made another century with 115 runs from 154 deliveries in the first innings of the fifth and final Test at the SCG. His 128-run partnership with Brad Haddin helped Australia come back from 5–97 to 326 all out in the first innings and eventually went on to win the Test match by 281 runs. The victory in Sydney marked a 5–0 victory towards Australia after a dismal 3–0 loss during the winter period of 2013. Smith made two centuries with a total of 327 runs at an average of 36. Smith played just one ODI match during England's tour during 2013–14, in the 4th ODI at Perth where he made 19 runs.

Tour of South Africa 2014
Following a 5–0 victory against England in the Ashes, Australia were scheduled three Test matches and three T20 matches in South Africa. In the first Test at Centurion, Johannesburg, Smith made his fourth century and first in South Africa, where he and Shaun Marsh made a 233 run partnership from 4–98. Smith was not required in the second innings and Australia won the Test by 281 runs. The second Test in Port Elizabeth saw a slower pitch as Smith made 49 and a duck and South Africa levelled the series 1–1. In the deciding Test match in Cape Town, Smith made 89 runs in the first innings and finished 36 not out in the second innings as Australia won the series 2–1. Steve Smith produced 269 runs at an average of 67.25, the third-best in the series and the second-best by an Australian, second to David Warner.

Tri-Series in Zimbabwe and the UAE 2014

The five-month break from cricket activity saw a surprise pick of Smith called up for the 2014 Zimbabwe Tri-Series on the August 2014. Smith prior to the tour had two ODI matches in the last two years. In his first match against Zimbabwe, he was run out by Sikandar Raza. He made scores in his thirties in his participating matches but only made 10 runs in the final against South Africa on 6 September, where South Africa went on to win the Tri-Series.

The squad later travelled to the UAE to face Pakistan in a T20 Match, three ODIs and two Tests. In the first and only T20 match, Pakistan won the toss and made 96 runs in their allotment of 20 overs, setting Australia a target of 97 runs to win. Smith made three runs before being dismissed. Despite this, Australia won by six wickets.

Following the T20 came the 3-match ODI series. In the first ODI at Sharjah Cricket Stadium, Smith made his first ODI century scoring 101 runs off 118 balls to push the visitors to a 1–0 lead in the series. In the second ODI he made 12 runs and in the third and final ODI he made 77 runs off 105 balls to win the ODI match by 1 run. However, during the match, Steve Smith's catch on Fawad Alam questioned whether his catch was within the ICC laws. The incident occurred when in the 18th over of Pakistan's chase of 231 where Xavier Doherty delivered the ball and before Fawad made contact with his paddle sweep, Smith had moved from first slip towards leg slip to intercept the shot. The legality of the catch continued to be the main talking point after the ODI Series and afterwards ICC made a press statement stating that: "As long as the movement of a close catching fielder is in response to the striker's actions (the shot he/she is about to play or shaping to play), then movement is permitted before the ball reaches the striker. On the day, if umpires believe any form of significant movement is unfair (in an attempt to deceive the batsman), then the Law still applies." The win saw Australia rise back to number one in the ICC ODI Rankings and Steve Smith was made man of the series for his batting performances.

Transitioning into the Test series saw Australia's continued failure against reverse swing and spin in the subcontinent. In the warm-up match against Pakistan A in Sharjah, Australia lost by 153 runs where Smith made 58 but retired out. In the first Test in Dubai, Smith made 22 runs in the first innings and 55 runs in the second innings but collectively lost the Test match by 221 runs. In the second Test, Smith made a duck and 97 runs but Australia's woes against spin continued as Australia lost by 356 runs. In the series he made 174 runs at an average of 43.5 runs.

South Africa and India in Australia 2014–15
Arriving back from the subcontinent following their 2–0 Test defeat against Pakistan. Smith played in the series against South Africa where Australia defeated South Africa 4–1 in the ODI Series. He missed the first match due to selectors picking Shane Watson over Smith but later joined the remainder of the games due to Michael Clarke's hamstring injury. In his first match in Perth he registered 10 runs but in the following games he made 73*, 104 and 67 runs. His hundred in the 4th ODI at the MCG was Smith's first on Australian soil. Smith scored 254 runs at an average of 84.66, the highest Australian total in the series and consequently receiving the man of the series award.

India arrived in Australia to play the Border-Gavaskar Test match series and a tri-series ODI competition with England. The first Test was scheduled to begin on 4 December in Brisbane, but was later postponed because of the death of Phillip Hughes. The first Test was later rescheduled to the Adelaide Oval on 9 December and Brisbane would be hosting the second Test on 17 December. In the first Test match in Adelaide, the Australian players wore Hughes' Test cap number 408 on their playing shirts for the match as well as black armbands in honour of their former teammate. In the first Test match in Adelaide, Smith scored 162* from 298 balls in the first and made 52* in the second innings, defeating India by 48 runs into day five. This also marked Steve Smith's first Test century against India and at the Adelaide Oval.

On 15 December, Smith was named Australia's new vice-captain and following an injury to Michael Clarke, he was appointed stand-in skipper against India with Brad Haddin as his deputy. He made his captaincy debut for Australia in the Second Test match against India at the Gabba.
He continued his batting form and made 133 runs in the first innings before being run-out in the second innings with a score of 28. Smith was awarded man of the match as Australia defeated India by 4 wickets. Australia were then up 2–0 in the series. In the third Test at the Melbourne Cricket Ground, Smith made his third consecutive century in the first innings of the Test match scoring 192 runs in 433 balls. He also scored his 1,000th run in the 2014 calendar year, and became the eighth-fastest Australian to reach 2000 Test runs, beating previous Australian captains such as Michael Clarke and Ricky Ponting.

The final Test match at the Sydney Cricket Ground saw Smith in his fourth consecutive century against India. The achievement saw Smith join Don Bradman (6), Neil Harvey, Jack Fingleton and Matthew Hayden (4 each) as Australian centurions in four or more consecutive Tests, a streak Smith started during the 1st Test at Adelaide. Smith also became the first Australian skipper to open their captaincy with three consecutive centuries, and the second batsman since Jacques Kallis against West Indies to score a century in every match of a Test series. The Test match ended in a draw as Australia defeated India 2–0 in the series, thus returning the Border–Gavaskar Trophy to Australia. The conclusion of the Test series saw Smith be given the man of the series award, scoring 769 runs at an average of 128.16, the highest aggregate score in a four-test match series in Australia and also marked the highest number of runs scored against India by an Australian, surpassing Donald Bradman.

Following the Test series, an ODI tri-series with India and England was confirmed in preparation for the upcoming Cricket World Cup hosted by Australia and New Zealand.
In his first ODI match against England in Sydney, he was dismissed at 37 runs by Moeen Ali but continued to provide runs in the following matches leading to the final against England. En route to the tri-series final, Smith was handed his first ODI match on 20 January as the skipper after George Bailey was suspended for a slow-over rate earlier in the series. Three days later, Smith scored his first ODI century against England producing 102 runs in 95 balls; the win saw Australia qualify for the final and later defeating England to win the Carlton Mid Triangular Series in Australia 2014–15.

Cricket World Cup in Australia 2015

In the World Cup, Smith played a vital role as versatile batsman as he played in numerous batting positions from number three down to as a middle-order batsman. In Australia's opening match of the World Cup, against England, he was dismissed early on 5 but later improved as the tournament progressed. After making half centuries against Afghanistan, Sri Lanka and Pakistan, he later steered Australia into the final after making a century against India in the semi-finals at the Sydney Cricket Ground. In the final, Australia drew against fellow neighbours New Zealand after defeating South Africa. Australia's target to chase 183 runs after a New Zealand collapse saw Steve Smith score 58 not out alongside the skipper, Michael Clarke as Australia won by 7 wickets with 101 balls remaining. Smith was Australia's highest run scorer in the tournament, scoring 402 runs at an average of 67, including a century and four fifties. He was named in the team of the tournament for the 2015 World Cup by the ICC. He was also named in the team of the tournament by ESPNcricinfo and Cricbuzz.

Tour of the West Indies 2015

After winning the World Cup in March, Australia's winter schedule was later released with the Test team returned from their short break towards their two Test series against the West Indies in the Caribbean. Due to IPL commitments, Smith missed out on Australia's maiden warm up match against the West Indies Cricket Board President's XI on 27 May. He later joined the Test squad in the first Test match in Windsor Park, and scored 25 and 5 runs, respectively. In the second Test match in Sabina Park, Smith steered Australia to a first innings score of 399, where he made 199 and became the eighth man in Test history to be dismissed on 199. Australia later won the match in positive fashion, beating the West Indies by 277 runs within four days and retained the Frank Worrell Trophy. After his man of the match effort against the West Indies in the second Test, Smith became the second-youngest player ever to reach the number 1 ICC Test batsmen ranking and just the eighth Australian to do so.

Ashes in England 2015

The 2–0 victory against the West Indies gave Australia some momentum into the long-awaited Ashes series in the British Isles. While Australia's last Ashes tour was in 2013, the emergence of England's Joe Root and Australia's Steve Smith saw an awaited clash to determine the better batsman in the upcoming series. With the Australians in good form and England drawing to New Zealand and West Indies gave Australia some confidence to the countdown to the first Test in Cardiff. Smith started positively in his first-class match with a century against Kent in Canterbury. He was rested for the second first-class match and in the first Test match in Cardiff, Smith made 33 in both innings as England took a 1–0 lead in the series. In the second Test in Lord's, Smith produced 215 runs in his first innings, his highest Test score and became the first Australian to score a double-ton at Lord's since the Second World War. His double century also made Smith pass 3000 Test runs, the third-youngest Australia to reach the feat. In his second innings he made 58 runs before Australia levelled the series in a 405 run rout.

In the third Test in Edgbaston, Smith made 7 and 8 runs, respectively, both dismissed by Steven Finn, but Smith's low scores saw England take a 2–1 lead into the series. In the fourth Test in Trent Bridge, Australia needed a win to draw the series. With overcast conditions and a green top, Alastair Cook won the toss and elected to field. In the first innings, Smith was dismissed again cheaply by Stuart Broad with a score of 6, as Australia capitulated in the first session of a total 60 runs from 18.3 overs—is the quickest—in terms of balls faced—a team has been bowled out in the first innings of a Test match. In the second innings, Smith was again caught by Ben Stokes in the slips from Stuart Broad with a meagre score of 5. England within three days regained the Ashes and took an unassailable 3–1 lead and critics began to question Smith's performances in seaming conditions. Into the fifth and final Test match back at The Oval, Smith made his second century in the series registering 143 runs off 252 balls before being bowled by Finn. Australia later defeated England by an innings and 46 runs. However, England regained the Ashes 3–2 after winning in Nottingham in early August and later saw the Test retirements of Australia's senior players: Michael Clarke, Chris Rogers and later Shane Watson, Ryan Harris and Brad Haddin. Overall, Smith made 508 runs at an average of 56.44, the most runs scored in the series.

2015–2018: Australian captaincy

The retirement of Michael Clarke following Australia's 3–2 defeat in the 2015 Ashes series saw Smith appointed as the full-time captain of the Australian Test team. Fellow New South Welshman David Warner was appointed as his vice-captain.

New Zealand, West Indies and ascension to captaincy 2015–16

Next followed a three Test home series against New Zealand. Smith's output in the first Test in Brisbane was modest, scoring 48 and 1, as the team romped home for a win in a high scoring game. During the second Test, Smith scored 27 in the first innings before breaking the shackles with 138 in the second innings. This was Smith's first-ever second innings century; all previous centuries having been scored in the first innings of a Test match. Australia went on to draw the second Test.
In the third Test, significant for being the first-ever day-night Test held at the Adelaide Oval, Smith defied difficult batting conditions to register 53 in the first innings, before falling for 14 in the second innings. Australia won the match in a tight contest.

Shortly after the series against New Zealand, a three Test series was to be held against the West Indies. During the first innings of the first Test, Smith was caught behind on 10, and did not bat again, due to Australia's dominance. The second Test was successful for the captain, scoring 134* and 70* in each respective innings, as Australia went on to seal a series victory. Due to poor weather conditions, the third Test was a wash out, with very little play able to be held.

In 2015 Smith was awarded the Sir Garfield Sobers Trophy (ICC Cricketer of the Year) and ICC Test Player of the Year award and named in ICC Test Team of the Year and ICC ODI Team of the Year by the ICC. In the same year, he also received the Allan Border Medal, Australian Test Player of the Year and Australian One Day International Player of the Year award. He was also named in the Test XI of the year 2015 by ESPNcricinfo.

Tour of New Zealand and T20 World Cup 2016
A two Test return tour against New Zealand took place in February 2016. Smith looked to be in fine touch, registering 71, 138, and 53* in the three innings in which he batted, as the Australian team won 2–0.

During the T20 World Cup 2016, held in India, Smith struggled with form early, before registering 61 against Pakistan in a must-win pool match for Australia.
Smith went on to score only 2 against India, as Australia were knocked out of the tournament. It was believed that Smith was incorrectly given out, having clean missed a ball the umpires deemed to have been edged.

Tour of Sri Lanka 2016
Smith then led the Australian Cricket Team on their tour of Sri Lanka. The three Test series was a disaster for the Aussies, losing 3–0. Smith was Australia's highest run scorer in the series, scoring 247 runs at an average of 41, including one century and one fifty. Throughout the following ODI series, Smith averaged in excess of 40 across the first two matches, before leaving early for a rest.

ODI Tour of South Africa 2016
Australia's disappointing run of form continued into their ODI tour of South Africa. They lost the first 3 matches, largely attesting to their young bowling attack's inability to contain a strong South African batting line-up. Smith was disappointing in output across the first two ODIs, before scoring 108 off 107 balls in the 3rd match, as he and David Warner helped Australia to 371. Despite the large total, it was chased down by South Africa in the 50th over. Australia lost the 5-match series 5–0.

South Africa, New Zealand and Pakistan in Australia 2016–17

Following the 5–0 ODI defeat in South Africa, the Australian team returned home for a 3 Test series against South Africa. In the first Test Smith made a duck and 34 runs, and Australia lost the Test match. In the second Test at Hobart, Smith made 48 not out in the first innings but the team capitulated, only making a total score of 85 runs and ending up losing the Test. Following the defeat, criticism of Smith's captaincy and the team's performance emerged which saw the influx of young players such as Matt Renshaw, Peter Handscomb and Nic Maddison for the last Test. After losing five consecutive Tests, Smith made 59 and 40, respectively, with the addition of his team performances to win the day-night Test match in Adelaide. The win in Adelaide avoided a 3–0 whitewash at home, as the 2–1 defeat marked Smith's first series defeat at home.

After the Test series against South Africa, New Zealand played 3 ODIs in between the two Test series against South Africa and Pakistan. In the first ODI, Steve Smith registered 164 runs at the SCG, marking the highest ODI score at the ground, beating the previous score of 162 set by AB De Villiers during the 2015 World Cup. He was awarded "man of the match". In the second ODI he made 72 runs and in Melbourne of the final ODI he was dismissed for a duck. The Australian team won the contested Chappell-Hadlee Trophy 3–0 and returned the trophy to Australia.

Pakistan was scheduled to have three Test series and 5 ODIs. In the first Test in Brisbane, Smith made 130 and 63 runs. His century in Brisbane marked his 16th Test century and his first against Pakistan. Despite Pakistan being bowled out for a low score of 142 in the first innings, Smith's captaincy tactics sparked a mixed response from critics when the on-field umpires made the decision to increase the fourth day evening session for another thirty minutes, believing a result would be determined. Pakistan made a 4th innings total of 450, as Australia won by 39 runs. The second Test match was held at the Melbourne Cricket Ground and Smith later placed his seventeenth century, the fourth-fastest to do so and also reaching 1000 runs in the calendar year—his third consecutive achievement of this since 2014. Despite intermittent rain, Australia managed an unlikely victory into the last session of day five, resulting in a 2–0 win for Australia. The final Test at the Sydney Cricket Ground marked Steve Smith's 50th Test match, as Australia whitewashed Pakistan 3–0 . Following the victory, he was awarded "Man of the Series" after making a total of 441 runs—the most in the series from both sides.

Smith was once again featured in ICC's 2016 Cricket Awards as a 12th man for the ICC Test team of the year. In the ODI Series against Pakistan, Smith experienced mixed results but played a vital role, with Australia later ending up routing Pakistan 4–1. On 19 January 2017, Steve Smith produced his 8th ODI century against Pakistan at the WACA Ground—becoming the quickest Australian to reach 3000 ODI runs within 79 innings. Following the home series, Smith was scheduled to tour three ODI matches against New Zealand for the Chappell–Hadlee Trophy but later sustained a mild sprain to the medial ligament in his left ankle, so he headed to Dubai in preparation for the upcoming four Test tour of India.

Tour of India 2017

Following the training at ICC's Cricket Academy Centre in Dubai, Smith began the tour of India with a century in their maiden warm-up match in Mumbai. He replicated his ton in the first Test in Pune where he produced his first century in the Indian Subcontinent, accompanied by the support of his bowlers to win their first Test match in India since 2004 and breaking India's 19 match undefeated streak, stretching back from 2012. Veteran commentator Harsha Bhogle and other Indian Media rated Smith's third innings hundred at Pune as one of the best ever by a visiting player in India. The Wisden described Smith's ton as an impossible hundred on a minefield of a pitch at Pune where all other batsman from both sides struggled to get a decent score.

{{Quote box
| width = 35%
| align = right
| quoted = 1
| quote = "Our choice as the best Test innings is when the world's leading Test batsman defied form and a devilish pitch to produce a most unlikely, match-winning hundred.| salign = right
| source = — Wisden on Smith's Pune hundred. 
}}

In the 3rd Test match in Ranchi, which is the first-ever Test match hosted at this venue, Steve Smith scored yet another century, 178 not out. This is the third-highest score by an Australian cricketer in Test matches played in India and the highest by an Australian Captain. In the fourth Test in Dharmasala, Smith scored 111 in the first innings which helped Australia to a first innings score of 300. In the second innings, Smith played a ball onto his stumps after scoring a rapid and threatening 17 runs off 15 balls. Smith was the highest run scorer in the series, scoring 499 runs at an average of 71.29, including three centuries.

 Ashes in Australia 2017–18 

In the first Test at Brisbane, Smith scored the first century of the series, 141*, which was his 21st Test century in his 105th innings—making him the third-quickest to score 21 Test centuries behind Donald Bradman and Sunil Gavaskar.

On 16 December 2017, Smith scored 239 in the final Ashes match at the WACA Ground. He was quick to score his 22nd century at the WACA, his century coming from 138 balls, including sixteen fours and a six, before he converted that into a career-best 239. It was his second double-hundred and his first as captain.

In the fourth Ashes test at Melbourne, Smith continued his prodigious form when he scored 76 in the first innings before he was bowled by England debutant Tom Curran, providing him with his first wicket in test cricket. A series best 244* by England's Alastair Cook then placed Australia in a tense situation that saw them trail by 164 at the start of the fourth day. Coming in at 2/65 before lunch on a rain affected day four, Smith batted until the closure of play on day five and scored yet another century, finishing with a defiant 102* from 275 deliveries to guide Australia to a draw and denying England of its first victory in Australia since 2011.

Smith concluded the 2017 calendar year with six centuries and three fifties, along with an average of 76.76 and a total of 1,305 runs, the highest of any player that year. During the final Ashes match in Sydney, Smith reached the milestone of 6,000 Test runs in 111 innings, becoming the equal second-fastest player and also the youngest Australian, ever to do so.

Smith garnered praise from opponent captain Joe Root for leading the team from the front, and in Root's opinion Smith was the difference between the two teams during 2017–18 Ashes series. Smith was the highest run scorer in the series, scoring 687 runs at an average of 137.40, including three centuries and two fifties.

In 2017 Smith was awarded the ICC Test Player of the Year award and named in the ICC Test Team of the Year by the ICC. In February 2018 he received the Allan Border Medal and Australian Test Player of the Year award.

2018: Tour of South Africa, ball-tampering incident and suspension
Tour of South Africa 2018

Smith was rested for the T20 series against New Zealand and England so he could prepare for the South African Test series. The series was marred by controversial incidents on and off field. Australia won the first Test by 118 runs with Smith making scores of 56 and 38 runs. The result was overshadowed by a stairwell confrontation between Australian vice captain David Warner and South African wicket-keeper Quinton de Kock. Footage emerged showing Warner having to be physically restrained after words were spoken between the two. This led to Smith and opposing captain Faf du Plessis being called to a meeting with umpires and match officials, where they were reminded of their responsibility to control their teams. South Africa won the second Test by 6 wickets, with Smith's contributions being only 25 and 11 runs. Smith's diminishing returns with the bat and lower than average strike rate suggested that he may have been struggling somewhat. During the match South African fast bowler and player of the match Kagiso Rabada was suspended for the following Test after he made physical contact with Smith after he dismissed him. Rabada successfully appealed the ban; a decision that annoyed Smith.

Ball-tampering incident and suspension
Australia lost by 322 runs in the third Test, with Smith barely contributing to the score. However, the match result was overshadowed by illegal ball tampering that occurred on the third day. Cameron Bancroft, the second-youngest and most inexperienced member of the team, was captured by television cameras surreptitiously using sandpaper to rough up the cricket ball. He then hid the sandpaper in his underwear before being confronted by the on-field umpires. When attending the press conference at the conclusion of the third day's play with Bancroft, Smith admitted that the "leadership group" of the team discussed tampering with the ball to influence the result of the match during the lunch break. He admitted that he was part of the "leadership group" but did not identify the other members. Smith and vice-captain David Warner stood down from the team leadership the morning after the incident, but still played on, and wicketkeeper Tim Paine took over as interim captain for the rest of the Test match. Subsequently, match referee Andy Pycroft for the ICC banned Smith for one Test match and fined him 100% of his match fee. He handed Bancroft three demerit points and fined him 75% of his match fee.

Cricket Australia launched an independent investigation, charging Smith with bringing the game into disrepute. He was suspended and sent home from the tour. The report stated that, while he did not develop the plan, Smith was found to have misled match officials and others, and as captain did not act to prevent it. He was therefore banned from all international and domestic cricket for 12 months starting from 29 March 2018. He was also debarred from consideration for any team leadership role for an additional 12 months. Warner and Bancroft also received bans. Smith also had his contract with the Rajasthan Royals IPL team for the 2018 season terminated by the Board of Control for Cricket in India as a consequence of the sanctions.

Smith arrived in Sydney on 29 March. In a press conference at Sydney Airport, a tearful Smith started by saying that he had nothing to add to Cricket Australia's report. He said that as captain of the Australian cricket team, he took full responsibility (even though he did not devise the plan to change the condition of the ball or actually perform the act), and that he had made a serious error in judgement: "It was a failure of leadership, my leadership." As well as apologising to his "teammates, to fans of cricket all over the world and to all Australians who are disappointed and angry", he specifically referred to the effect that the incident had had on his parents and implored others faced with questionable decisions to consider their parents. He added, "I know I will regret this for the rest of my life. I'm absolutely gutted. I hope in time I can earn back respect and forgiveness."

 2019: Return to international cricket, dominant Ashes series 
 ODI World Cup in England 2019 

In April 2019, he was named in Australia's squad for the 2019 Cricket World Cup. After missing the 2018–19 season, Smith was awarded a national contract by Cricket Australia for the 2019–20 season. On 1 June 2019, Smith played in Australia's opening match of the Cricket World Cup, against Afghanistan, at the County Ground in Bristol. On 11 July 2019, in the semi-final match against England Smith scored 85 runs, becoming the second batsman after Sachin Tendulkar to score four 50+ scores in Cricket World Cup knockouts. In the tournament, he scored 379 runs at an average of 37.90, including four fifties.

 Ashes in England 2019 

In July 2019, he was named in Australia's squad for the 2019 Ashes series in England. In the first Test at Edgbaston, Smith scored centuries in both innings, his ninth and tenth Ashes centuries and his 24th and 25th overall. Smith's first innings hundred was hailed as one of his finest ever by British Media as he was returning from a year-long suspension and was batting with the tail for a large part of his innings under tricky conditions. His 25th came in his 119th innings, second only to Don Bradman (who took 69 innings). Smith also rated his first innings hundred at Edgbaston as his best ever.

In the first innings of the second Test, his innings was interrupted on 80, when he was hit by a 148.7 km/h ball on the left side of his neck, under the ear from Jofra Archer. He later returned to complete his innings after passing the concussion tests and was out, lbw, for 92. On 18 August 2019, the final day of the Test, Smith was replaced by Marnus Labuschagne, after further tests showed he had actually suffered concussion due to the blow the previous day. Therefore, Labuschagne became the first player to become a concussion substitute in a Test match following a change in the International Cricket Council's (ICC) rules. The concussion then ruled him out of the third Test, though this did not stop him reclaiming the number one position in the Test batting rankings on 3 September 2019.

In the first innings of the fourth Test at Old Trafford Smith scored his third double-century in Test matches and third century in the series and became the first batsman to score 500 or more runs in three successive Ashes series.

Smith registered his tenth consecutive Ashes fifty-plus score in the first innings of the fifth Test, breaking Inzamam Ul Haq's record for the most consecutive Test 50+ scores against a single opposition. He finished the series with 774 runs at an average of 110.57, by far the most on either side. Smith made 3 hundreds and 3 fifties. He was awarded his second consecutive Compton–Miller Medal as the man of the series.

British Media along with former cricketers rated his dominating batting in the series as one of the greatest batting displays in a test series.

2019–2021: Form slump
Sri Lanka, Pakistan and New Zealand in Australia 2019–20

After retaining the Ashes in England, the Australian team returned home for two back to back T20I series against Sri Lanka and Pakistan. In the first T20I against Sri Lanka, Smith did not bat, but made 53 not out and 13 in the second and third matches respectively. Australia went on to win the three match series 3–0. Although Smith was not required to bat in the first and third T20Is against Pakistan, his valuable contribution of 80 not out in the second match helped Australia win the match by seven wickets, and go on to win the T20I series 2–0.

Following the T20I series', Australia played Pakistan and New Zealand at home in two and three match Test series respectively. In contrast to the preceding Ashes tour, Smith made little contribution with the bat throughout the test series against Pakistan, scoring 4 and 36 in the first and second matches respectively. Despite this, Australia went on to win the Test series 2–0, winning both matches by an innings margin. During the second test match of the series at Adelaide, Smith overtook Donald Bradman as the 11th highest run scorer for Australia in tests. Smith also became the fastest test batsman to score 7,000 test runs in his 126th innings, bettering the 73-year-old record of Walter Hammond (130 innings).

In the first day-night Test match at Perth against New Zealand, Smith struggled, scoring 43 and 16, and was dismissed both innings to the short-pitched bowling of fast-bowler Neil Wagner. Australia went on to win the first Test by 296 runs. In the second test at Melbourne, Smith continued to find form when he scored 85 in the first innings before he was again dismissed by Neil Wagner, denying Smith of a record fifth consecutive Test century at the MCG. Although Australia bowled New Zealand out for 148 and progressively built on their large first innings lead, Smith was dismissed for 7 in the second innings, giving Neil Wagner his 200th Test wicket and fourth consecutive dismissal of Smith in the series. Despite this, Australia comfortably won the match by 247 runs and retained the Trans-Tasman Trophy. On Day 1 of the Melbourne test, Smith also went past Greg Chappell's tally of 7,110 moving into 10th position as highest run-scorer for Australia in Tests. The 3rd Test saw Smith reach the half-century mark again, reaching 63 from 182 balls, taking 45 minutes to get off the mark. Australia won the match by 279 runs, completing a clean sweep of the Test series.

In a similar vein to Bodyline devised by England in the 1930s to disrupt Bradman's scoring, which was largely employed by Harold Larwood, New Zealand devised a set of tactics to curb Smith's scoring. It involved left-arm fast-medium bowler Neil Wagner pitching short to Smith attempting to get him out caught on the leg side. The plan enjoyed good results, with Wagner dismissing Smith all four times in Perth and Melbourne, however Colin de Grandhomme claimed Smith's wicket in the Test at Sydney. Smith himself said after the first Test, "The pink one's a little bit different - it just sort of comes off the wicket at different paces ... I couldn't quite time the ball where I wanted to at certain times but no doubt I'm going to get a little bit (of short-pitch bowling) in Melbourne, I dare say, on probably a different wicket. We'll see how we go." Despite Smith scoring 214 runs from 5 innings at an average of 42.80, and atypically for Smith a low strike rate of 34.13—who just three months earlier in the 2019 Ashes scored at a rate of 64.71 per 100 balls—Australia managed to win all three Tests by a margin of over 200 runs, largely thanks to Labuschagne's batting.

 Tours of India and South Africa 2019–20 

Australia travelled to India to play three ODI matches between 14 and 19 January 2020. Smith was not required in the first match. In the second match, Smith came in at 1/20 and looked set to reach another hundred, but was dismissed for 98 as he played on to his stumps off Kuldeep Yadav. In the 3rd match, Smith made 131 off 132 balls as Australia reached a total of 286 from the 50 overs. However, Smith's hundred was in vain as India chased down the target in the 48th over, India winning the series 2–1.

Australia travelled to South Africa to play a 3 ODI matches and 3 T20I matches between 21 February and 7 March 2020. The first match of the T20I series in Johannesburg saw Smith topscore with 45, helping Australia to a total of 196 winning by 107 runs. Australia was sent in to bat in the 3rd match at Cape Town, making 193 runs from their 20 overs, Smith remaining not out on 30 from 15 balls. South Africa was bowled out for 96, Australia winning by 97 runs, and winning the T20I series 2–1.

Smith topscored in the first ODI match with 76, but the rest of the team could only manage 134 between them, getting bowled out in the 46th over for 217. Smith failed to make any significant scores for the remaining games as Australia lost the ODI series 0–3.

 New Zealand in Australia 2020 

New Zealand returned to Australia after the Test series, with games scheduled to be held on 13, 15 and 20 March 2020. The first match was won by Australia, with a winning margin of 71 runs; Smith getting bowled for 14 by Santner. However, due to the COVID-19 pandemic, the 2nd and 3rd matches were cancelled without a ball being bowled due to travel restrictions.

 Tour of England 2020 

On 16 July 2020, Smith was named in a 26-man preliminary squad of players to begin training ahead of a possible tour to England following the COVID-19 pandemic. On 14 August 2020, Cricket Australia confirmed that the fixtures would be taking place, with Smith included in the touring party.

Smith's scoring was unremarkable in the 3 T20I matches. Between the last T20I match and first ODI match, Smith was struck on the head at training, and subsequently missed the first two ODIs. Smith was still feeling the effects before the 3rd ODI, and was left out again, missing all three matches in the series.

 India in Australia 2020–21 

India's tour began with a 3-match ODI series. In the first match in Sydney, Smith came to the wicket after a large opening partnership, and put on a 108-run partnership with Aaron Finch. Smith brought up his hundred off 62 deliveries, the third fastest by an Australian and finished with 105 runs off 66 balls. Smith made a second century in the second match at Sydney, again requiring only 62 deliveries. He was dismissed on 104 from 64 deliveries. Smith and Labuschagne put on a 136-run partnership. Australia won the match by 51 runs, and Smith was again awarded Player of the Match for his performance. Australia won the series 2–1. Smith was awarded Player of the Series for his efforts.

Following the ODI series was a 3-match T20I series. Smith made a respectable 46 in the second match, but his scores in the other matches were unremarkable. Australia lost the series 1–2.

In November 2020, Smith was nominated for the Sir Garfield Sobers Award for ICC Male Cricketer of the Decade, and the award for Test cricketer of the decade.

Smith's poor form for his standards continued as he scored 1 and 1* in the opening Test of the Border-Gavaskar trophy in Adelaide, Australia winning the match after bowling India out for 36, their lowest total in Tests. Smith scored 0 and 8 at Melbourne as India won by 8 wickets in contrast to his previous seven Tests at the ground where he had averaged 113.50. Since the 2019 Ashes, Smith had averaged 26.40. Ex-Australian captain Ian Chappell noted "He doesn't look as comfortable at the crease because India have given him things to think about" and "In trying to avoid one way of getting out, you can create another one, and I think that's happened a bit with Smith."

Smith was able to break his 14-innings century drought since the 2019 Ashes at his home ground in Sydney with a 226-ball 131 in the first innings. He followed that up with a 167-ball 81 in the third innings, helping to set India a target of 407 in the fourth innings. The match ended in a draw as the series was poised 1 all.

In the fourth and final match of the series at the Gabba, Smith made 36 in the first innings and topscored for Australia with 55 in the third innings. Australia set India a target of 328 to win. India took the game into the 5th day as they chased the target with three wickets remaining as Australia lost the series 1–2.

 T20 World Cup in the UAE 2021 

Smith was ruled out of the tours to West Indies and Bangladesh with an elbow injury in his left arm — a recurrence of an injury that prohibited him from playing domestic cricket for a month during February and March in 2021. National selection panel chair Trevor Hohns said of the injury - "I can't tell you how long or how serious it is but it's something that he's had before, and it definitely flared up again whilst playing in the IPL ... How long it'll take to get it completely right, I can't tell you that at the moment … the main thing from our point of view with Steven is to make sure he is fit for the T20 World Cup and of course the Ashes next season." In August 2021, Smith was named in Australia's squad for the 2021 ICC Men's T20 World Cup.

Smith played a "floating position" in Australia's win in the T20 World Cup. He scored 69 runs at a strike rate of 97.18.

 2021–present: Australian vice captaincy 

 Ashes in Australia 2021–22 

In November 2021, following Tim Paine's resignation from the Test captaincy amid allegations of improper conduct in 2017, Pat Cummins was promoted to captain of the Test side, as Smith returned to a leadership position with the vice captaincy. In the first Test in Brisbane, Smith fell to 'a lazy shot' to Mark Wood for 12.

Smith captained Australia for the second Test in Adelaide, when Cummins was ruled out for the match after he was deemed to be a close contact of someone with COVID-19. Smith passed 50 in the first innings, but was trapped leg before wicket on 93 to James Anderson to a ball that kept low. In the second innings, Smith survived multiple chances (including a first-ball drop by Buttler) but was out on 6, gloved down the leg side to Robinson. Smith had also picked up his first test wicket in 6 years, dismissing Jack Leach, who was caught by David Warner.

After the Test, Smith said "It brought back some old memories in a way and I had fun out there, but it's Patty's team. I'm the vice-captain and I will help him any way I can. That's my job. Hopefully we can keep the momentum going into what should be an amazing Boxing Day Test."

 Tour of Pakistan 2022 

Australia toured Pakistan in 2022 to play three tests, three ODIs and a one off T20I. Smith played during the three tests, but did not play in the ODIs and T20Is. This tour was the Australia's first tour of Pakistan since 1998. Smith performed well against Pakistan, averaging 56.50 in 4 innings and achieving a top score of 78, but did not manage to fully take advantage of the "dead" and "benign" pitch at the Rawalpindi Cricket Stadium during the first test, unlike his Pakistani contemporaries. During the series, Smith had also become the fastest man to reach 8,000 test runs, achieving it in 151 innings, one less than the previous title holder, Kumar Sangakkara and three innings faster than Sachin Tendulkar. Smith was also the first person to achieve this feat with a batting average over 60, reaching 8,000 test runs with a 60.1 average at the time.

 Tour of Sri Lanka 2022 

In 2022, Australia toured Sri Lanka for 3 T20Is, 5 ODIs and 2 tests. Smith did not play during the first T20I, but played in the second and third, where he scored 5 runs in the second match and 37 runs off of 27 balls and remained not out in the third match. Smith finished the T20I series with a 42.0 batting average, with a high score of 37. Smith played during the first two ODI matches, but was unable to play during the last three due to a quad injury. He scored 53 runs off 60 balls during the first match and scored 28 runs off of 35 balls during the second match. He finished the ODI series with an average of 40.50, a high score of 53 and scored 81 runs in 2 innings.

Smith played during both of the tests, and scored 6 runs off of 11 balls before being run out by Niroshan Dickwella. This mix up had caused Smith to lose his temper against his batting partner at the time, Usman Khawaja, where he was visibly irritated. However, Smith states that there is no lingering fallout between the two of them. Smith did not bat during the second innings, as Australia bowled Sri Lanka out for 212 and 113, and had a target of 5 runs, winning the match by 10 wickets. During the second test, Smith scored 145 runs off of 272 balls and remained not out. This was his first century since January 2021; a time span of 547 days, as well as being his 28th Test century. During the second innings however, Smith was dismissed for 0 and Australia collapsed, as Sri Lanka beat Australia by an innings and 39 runs. During the second innings, Smith had reviewed the original "out" decision by the umpire, only to confirm the umpire's decision. This review was called "comical" and "appalling" by multiple news sources. Smith finished the test series with 151 runs from 3 innings, an average of 75.50 and with a high score of 145*. He was the second highest run scorer during the series, behind Sri Lankan batsman, Dinesh Chandimal.

 T20 World Cup in Australia 2022 

 England and the West Indies in Australia 2022–23

In October 2022, Smith was named in the Australian ODI squad for the three-match home ODI series. He scored 195 runs including two half centuries in 3 matches at an average of 97.50 as Australia won the series in a 3–0 whitewash.

In November 2022, He was named in the Australia Test squad for the series against the West Indies.

In the first Test in Perth, Smith scored 200 not out from 311 deliveries, his fourth double-century in his Test career. Smith said after his innings: "I think from the first one-dayer against England, where I sort of implemented the work that I've been doing, it felt really good straightaway." He went on to say "I suppose the reason for my slight change in technique is because I was unhappy with where I was at with my batting ... But I think now with the way I'm able to play and the way teams have bowled against me, I've had to adapt a bit and where I'm at with my body and my hands I feel like I'm opening up the whole ground as opposed to probably just behind square on the leg side, and I'm able to hit the ball in different areas, which I probably was able to hit previously. So I feel in a good place."

 Home series against South Africa 

In December 2022, Smith was named in Australia's Test squad as the vice-captain for their home series against South Africa. In the third Test, on 5 January 2023, he scored 104 runs and moved past Matthew Hayden and Michael Clarke to become the fourth highest Australian Test run-scorer. This was also his 30th Test century, the equal third most by an Australian.''

Playing style 

Smith is a right-handed batsman with a technique that has attracted attention for its unorthodoxy. He moves around frequently in the crease, especially during bowlers' run-up, and ends up with the toes of his feet outside off stump against right-handers, controls the bat with his bottom hand (that is, the hand closest to the blade of the bat), and is capable of playing unconventional cricket shots like the reverse sweep. Playing in a club match in January 2010, right-handed Smith took guard left-handed and hit a six. Due to his unorthodox style, Smith was initially labelled as a limited-overs batsman who might struggle in the longer form of the game, especially early in his career when he was vulnerable outside off stump. However, Smith compensates for his unique technique with outstanding hand-eye co-ordination, focus, and his footwork, especially to spin bowlers, is exemplary. Smith spontaneously experimented with his technique during the Perth Test match in the 2013–14 Ashes, during which he decided to take a "prelim movement back and across" to counter short-pitched bowling. This change took his batting average from 33 in 2013 to 64.95 in 2019. As of 2021, it is 61.80. At the time of delivery, Smith's stumps are fully covered, making bowled dismissals unlikely. This position also allows him to play to either the on or off side with ease.

Much of the credit for Smith's success can also be attributed to batting coach Trent Woodhill, who coached Smith as a junior and noted his abundant talent. He has also defended Smith's unique batting style, and has long argued that in Australia, many naturally talented cricketers who may not necessarily have an orthodox technique are let down by over-coaching; in the years between leaving school and his elevation into international cricket, Smith had his technique picked apart by a number of well-intentioned coaches. Since re-establishing his working relationship with Woodhill, Smith appears to have regained calm and confidence in his cricket, which has since produced results over the last few seasons.  Smith is also known for his concentration, being able to bat for long periods of time, even through a whole day's play.

As a bowler, however, after his quick rise up the batting order (until he became captain, and settled in at 4), the comparisons to Shane Warne never gathered momentum. He was an able option as a leg spinner early in his career, but was under-used because he was described as a very defensive bowler.

When he was captain for Australia, he had been initially tagged as the second "Captain Grumpy" since Allan Border early in his captaincy reign, having to warn Mitchell Starc for unsportsmanlike behaviour, and being highly critical of the team's bowling and fielding despite beating New Zealand by over 200 runs in 2015. Later, in 2017–2018, he publicly criticised Glenn Maxwell's training regimen when Maxwell was dropped from the Australian ODI squad. He was also criticised for having too much influence over team selections.

Smith is consistently rated as one of the top-ranked Test batsmen in the world, according to the ICC Player Rankings.

Career best performances

, Smith has made a total of 45 first-class centuries, 13 List A centuries and one T20 century. Of these, 29 of his first-class centuries were scored in Test matches and 12 of his List A centuries scored in One Day Internationals. His best bowling figures of seven wickets for the cost of 64 runs (7/64) were taken for New South Wales against South Australia in the Sheffield Shield.

 Smith's highest score in Test and first-class cricket is 239 scored against England at the WACA Ground, Perth in 2017.
 His highest score in ODI and List A cricket is 164 scored against New Zealand at the Sydney Cricket Ground in 2016.
 His highest score in Twenty20 International matches is 90 runs, scored against England at Sophia Gardens, Cardiff in 2015.
 He has scored two T20 centuries. The first was for Rising Pune Supergiants against Gujarat Lions at Maharashtra Cricket Association Stadium, Pune in the 2016 Indian Premier League. The second was when he scored 101 off 56 balls against the Adelaide Strikers for the Sydney Sixers at C.ex Coffs International Stadium in the 2022–23 Big Bash League season.

Test match performance

Records and achievements 

 Fastest Australian batsman and sixth-fastest batsman in the world to reach 10,000 runs in International cricket.
 Fastest batsman to reach 7,000, 8,000 runs in Tests.
 Joint second-fastest batsman (after Don Bradman), youngest Australian and fourth youngest overall to reach 6,000 runs in Tests.

 Only the second batsman to score more than 1,000 runs in Test cricket in four consecutive calendar years.
 First batsman to register ten successive scores of 50 or more against a single opponent in Test history.

 The second-highest Test batting rating (947), behind Don Bradman's 961, reached on 30 December 2017.
 Only player to win the ICC Test Player of the Year award more than once.
 Second youngest batsman to top the ICC Test batting rankings.

 Joint most consecutive 50+ scores in World Cup history with five such scores in the 2015 Cricket World Cup.
 Joint most 50+ scores (four) in Cricket World Cup knockout matches.

 During the 2018 Australian tour to South Africa, he equalled the world record by taking five catches as a non-wicketkeeper in a Test innings and was the 11th fielder to achieve this feat.

 Youngest player to win the Sir Garfield Sobers Trophy (ICC Cricketer of the Year award).
 Fastest batsman after Donald Bradman (68 Innings) to reach 25 test centuries (119 Innings).
 Fifth player to win the Allan Border Medal more than once.
 First cricketer to win the McGilvray Medal four times.
 Named as ICC Test batsman of 2010's.
 Fastest Australian batsman to reach 14,000 runs in International cricket.
 First player to score a century in the Big Bash League for the Sydney Sixers. Smith scored 101 runs of 56 deliveries at C.ex Coffs International Stadium in Coffs Harbour, New South Wales against the Adelaide Strikers in their 59 run win. He was also named Man of the Match.
 Third player to win the Allan Border Medal four times, a record alongside former captains Ricky Ponting and Michael Clarke.

Awards 

 Sir Garfield Sobers Trophy (ICC Cricketer of the Year): 2015
 ICC Test Player of the Year: 2015, 2017
 ICC Men's Test Player of the Decade: 2011–2020
 ICC Men's Test Team of the Decade: 2011–2020
 ICC Test Team of the Year: 2015, 2016, 2017, 2019
 ICC ODI Team of the Year: 2015
 Allan Border Medal: 2015, 2018, 2021, 2023
 Australian Test Player of the Year: 2015, 2018
 Australian One Day International Player of the Year: 2015, 2021
 Compton–Miller Medal: 2017–18, 2019
 McGilvray Medal: 2014, 2015, 2016, 2017
 Steve Waugh Award: 2009–10, 2011–12
 Wisden Cricketers of the Year: 2015

In popular culture
The Test, a 2020 Australian English-language TV documentary, produced as an Original for Amazon Prime Video. The documentary was also co-produced by Cricket Australia. The documentary revolves around the Infamous ball-tampering scandal at Cape Town in March 2018 and how Australia rebuild their reputation after the scandal. Smith's redemption and his dominating batting display in the 2019 Ashes after the scandal was one of the key point of the series.

See also
 List of cricketers by number of international centuries scored
 List of cricketers who have scored centuries in both innings of a Test match

References

Publications

External links

 
Steve Smith at Howstat
Steve Smith at Cricket Australia
 

1989 births
Allan Border Medal winners
Australia One Day International cricketers
Australia Test cricket captains
Australia Test cricketers
Australia Twenty20 International cricketers
Australian cricketers
Australian people of English descent
Cricketers at the 2011 Cricket World Cup
Cricketers at the 2015 Cricket World Cup
Cricketers at the 2019 Cricket World Cup
Cricketers from Sydney
Kochi Tuskers Kerala cricketers
Living people
New South Wales cricketers
Pune Warriors India cricketers
Rising Pune Supergiant cricketers
Royal Challengers Bangalore cricketers
Sydney Sixers cricketers
Wisden Cricketers of the Year
Worcestershire cricketers
Barbados Royals cricketers
Comilla Victorians cricketers
International Cricket Council Cricketer of the Year
Delhi Capitals cricketers